Edgars Burlakovs (born 6 January 1974) is a former football midfielder from Latvia. His last club was Dinaburg FC.

Burlakovs previously played for FC Rubin Kazan in the Russian First Division during the 2000 season.

References

External links 
 

1974 births
Living people
Latvian footballers
Latvia international footballers
Dinaburg FC players
FC Tyumen players
FK Liepājas Metalurgs players
FC Rubin Kazan players
Sportspeople from Daugavpils
Latvian expatriate footballers
Expatriate footballers in Russia
Latvian expatriate sportspeople in Russia
Association football midfielders